Apache Warrior is a 1957 American Western film directed by Elmo Williams and written by Carroll Young, Kurt Neumann and Eric Norden. The film stars Keith Larsen, Jim Davis, Rodolfo Acosta, John Miljan, Damian O'Flynn and George Keymas. The film was released in July 1957, by 20th Century Fox.

It was also known as Red Arrow, The Apache Kid and The Long Knives. Filming started March 1957.

Plot

Cast 
 Keith Larsen as Katawan aka The Apache Kid
 Jim Davis as Ben Ziegler
 Rodolfo Acosta as Marteen
 John Miljan as Chief Nantan
 Damian O'Flynn as Major
 George Keymas as Chato
 Lane Bradford as Sgt. Gaunt
 Dehl Berti as Chikisin
 Eugenia Paul as Liwana
 Nick Thompson as Horse Trader 
 Eddie Little Sky as Apache
 Michael Carr as Apache
 Ray Kellogg as Bounty Hunter
 Karl Davis as Bounty Man 
 David Carlile as Cavalry Leader
 Allan Nixon as Bounty Hunter

References

External links 
 
 Apache Warrior at BFI

1957 films
1950s English-language films
20th Century Fox films
American Western (genre) films
1957 Western (genre) films
Films scored by Paul Dunlap
1950s American films